Cassim Langaigne (born 27 February 1980) is a Grenadian footballer who plays as a midfielder for Hurricanes SC and the Grenada national football team.

References

External links
 

1980 births
Living people
Grenadian footballers
Grenada international footballers
2009 CONCACAF Gold Cup players
2011 CONCACAF Gold Cup players
Association football midfielders